Clemens Wickler (born 28 April 1995) is a German beach volleyball player.

He won the silver medal at the 2019 Beach Volleyball World Championships with Julius Thole.

References

External links

1995 births
Living people
German men's beach volleyball players
People from Starnberg
Sportspeople from Upper Bavaria
Olympic beach volleyball players of Germany
Beach volleyball players at the 2020 Summer Olympics